Alexander Ibser (born 31 January 1991) is an Austrian footballer who plays for ASK Ebreichsdorf.

References

Austrian footballers
Austrian Football Bundesliga players
2. Liga (Austria) players
1991 births
Living people
SV Mattersburg players
Sportspeople from Baden bei Wien
Association football forwards
Footballers from Lower Austria